Otluca HES is a three-stage hydroelectric plant of Turkey.

It is in Anamur ilçe (district) of Mersin Province. It is to the north of Anamur and on Dragon Creek.  The main unit is at

Technical details

The technical details are as follows;

The total annual energy production capacity is 224 GW-hr. But currently the last unit hasn't been put into operation yet . 
The plant is being operated by the company Beyobası ( a subdiary of Akfen) .

References

Dams in Mersin Province
Hydroelectric power stations in Turkey
Anamur District